Rajya Sabha elections were held in 1968, to elect members of the Rajya Sabha, Indian Parliament's upper chamber.

Elections
Elections were held in 1968 to elect members from various states.
The list is incomplete.

Members elected
The following members are elected in the elections held in 1968. They are members for the term 1968-74 and retire in year 1974, except in case of the resignation or death before the term.

State - Member - Party

Bye-elections
The following bye elections were held in the year 1968.

State - Member - Party

  Nominated - D Sankara Kurup - NOM (  ele  03/04/1968 term till 1972 )
  Gujarat - Shamprasad R Vasavada - CO (  ele  30/08/1968 term till 1970 )

References

1968 elections in India
1968